Galeaspis is an extinct genus of ptychopariid trilobite in the family Catillicephalidae. Species are found in the Seletinian Horizon of the Kuyandinian faunal stage of Late Cambrian marine strata in Central Kazakhstan.  Fossil specimens are usually semicircular to bean-shaped, incomplete cranidia, with globular glabella (especially typified by the ball-shaped glabellum of the type species, G. sphaerica).

References

Ptychopariida

Ptychopariida genera
Cambrian trilobites
Fossils of Kazakhstan